Folly Bollards is a series of outdoor 1998 bronze bollard sculptures by Valerie Otani, installed along Southwest Main between Broadway and Park in Portland, Oregon, United States.

Description and history
Sculptures in the series, each of which are abstract bronzes that measure  x  x , include: 
 Folly Bollards: Anansi, African Trickster Spider, a spider
 Folly Bollards: El Viejito, Mexico, a Mexican figure
 Folly Bollards: Harlequin, a clown
 Folly Bollards: Monkey King, China, a monkey
 Folly Bollards: Nasreddin, a Turkish figure
 Folly Bollards: Nulamal, Kwakiuti Fool Dancer, a First Nations dancer

See also

 1998 in art
 Cultural depictions of spiders

References

External links
 Folly Bollards, 1998 at cultureNOW

1998 establishments in Oregon
1998 sculptures
Abstract sculptures in Oregon
Animal sculptures in Oregon
Bronze sculptures in Oregon
Clowns in art
Monkeys in art
Outdoor sculptures in Portland, Oregon
Sculptures of men in Oregon
Southwest Portland, Oregon
Spiders in art